Mayo is a district (amphoe) of Pattani province, southern Thailand.

History
The area of Mayo was originally part of Yaring district. In 1900 the district was established, then named Rako (ราเกาะ). When in the following year the district office in tambon Mayo was opened the district was renamed after its central tambon.

Geography
Neighboring districts are (from the north clockwise) Yaring, Panare, Thung Yang Daeng, and Yarang.

Administration
The district is divided into 13 sub-districts (tambons), which are further subdivided into 58 villages (mubans). Mayo is a township (thesaban tambon) which covers most parts of tambon Mayo. There are a further 10 tambon administrative organizations (TAO).

References

External links 
amphoe.com (in Thai)

Districts of Pattani province